Mulberry Plantation, also known as the  James and Mary Boykin Chesnut House is a historic plantation at 559 Sumter Highway (United States Route 521) south of Camden, South Carolina.  Declared a National Historic Landmark in 2000, it is significant as the home of American Civil War chronicler Mary Boykin Chesnut, who produced some of the most important written accounts of the war from a Confederate perspective.  The main house, built about 1820, is a fine example of Federal period architecture.

Description and history
An early 20th-century wrought iron gate, spelling "Mulberry" within its elements, stands across the road between brick piers. The main house is a handsome Federal period brick house,  stories in height, that was built about 1820, with possible design input from the noted South Carolina architect Robert Mills.

The plantation has a documented history of human habitation dating back as far as about 1250 CE, based on archaeological research of platform mounds found on the property.  It is believed to be the site of Cofitachequi, a major chiefdom visited by the explorer Hernando de Soto in the 16th century, and is also the location of a second archaeological site, the McDowell Site.

Mary Chesnut (the wife of James Chesnut Jr.) wrote a detailed diary of the war years. Her diary, refined and published by her in the 1870s, remains a major historical work of the period, chronicling the rise and fall of the Confederacy.

See also

List of National Historic Landmarks in South Carolina
National Register of Historic Places listings in Kershaw County, South Carolina

References

External links
Mulberry Plantation, Kershaw County (U.S. Hwy. 521, Camden vicinity), at South Carolina Department of Archives and History
"Writings of Mary Chesnut", broadcast from Mulberry Plantation from C-SPAN's American Writers

National Historic Landmarks in South Carolina
Houses in Kershaw County, South Carolina
Houses completed in 1820
Plantations in South Carolina
Plantation houses in South Carolina
Camden, South Carolina
Houses on the National Register of Historic Places in South Carolina
National Register of Historic Places in Kershaw County, South Carolina